Roberta Sessoli is Professor of General and Inorganic Chemistry in the Department of Chemistry "Ugo Schiff" at the University of Florence. Sessoli's research has had significant impact upon the field of molecular magnetism.

Education and early career 
Roberta Sessoli was born in Florence on the 23 June 1963. She attended Liceo Scientifico Guido Castelnuovo in Florence. She graduated in Chemistry from the University of Florence in 1987. In 1992, she obtained her PhD from the same university, under the supervision of Professor Dante Gatteschi. Her PhD thesis was on "Molecular Magnetic Materials" (original title in Italian: "Materiali Magnetici Molecolari").

Research interests 
Sessoli began working at the University of Florence in 2000, and became full Professor of General and Inorganic Chemistry in the Department of Chemistry "Ugo Schiff" at the University of Florence in 2012.

Sessoli is interested in molecular and low-dimensional magnetism. She also worked on the spin dynamics of nanostructured materials. She investigated the nature of single molecules magnets. Part of her research also focusses on quantistic technologies and spintronic molecular materials. More recently, her studies concentrated on  the characterisation of magnetic materials through the use of unpolarised light.

Publications 
Sessoli's most influential publication is "Magnetic bistability in a metal-ion cluster", published in Nature in 1993 only one year after the completion of her PhD. This was a particularly influential article in the field of molecular magnetism, and was co-authored with Dante Gatteschi, Andrea Caneschi and Miguel A. Novak. Since then the article has received more than 2770 citations. In 2018, Sessoli was nominated as one of the most highly cited researchers by Clarivate Analytics.

Sessoli co-authored the book "Molecular Nanomagnets" with Dante Gatteschi and Jacques Villain, which was published by Oxford University Press in 2006.

Awards 
For her work in chemistry, Sessoli received a wide range of awards: 
2000 Medaglia Nasini for best young inorganic chemist in Italy
2002 Gonfalone d’argento from the Regional Council of Tuscany
2002 Agilent Technologies Europhysics Prize
2012 Beller lectureship of the American Physical Society
2013 French-Italian Prize from Société Chimique de France
2013 Linceo Prize for Chemistry from Accademia Nazionale dei Lincei
2015 Lecoq de Boisbaudran Award from the European Rare Earths Society
2015 Fiorino d’oro from Florence City Council
2015 IUPAC Distinguished Women in Chemistry award
2017 Visiting Professorship at the Otago University, New Zealand
2018-2019 Visiting Professorship at the Johannes Gutenberg University Mainz
2019 RSC Centenary Prize for world-leading research on molecular magnetism

Family and personal life 
Sessoli has three sons.

The fire station in via La Farina in Florence is named after Sessoli's grandfather, Giuseppe Sessoli, who was a fireman during the Second World War and died trying to save a woman and a little girl who were on a mined bridge.

References 

Italian women chemists
21st-century Italian women
21st-century chemists
1963 births
Living people
Scientists from Florence
21st-century women scientists
Rare earth scientists
Academic staff of the University of Florence